For Two Pianos is an album by composer Anthony Braxton recorded in 1980 and first released on the Arista label in 1982. The album features a composition by Braxton written for two pianists which was subsequently rereleased on CD on The Complete Arista Recordings of Anthony Braxton released by Mosaic Records in 2008.

Track listing
 "FWQ G x G V (For Two Pianos) [Composition 95]" (Anthony Braxton) - 49:45

Personnel
Ursula Oppens, Frederic Rzewski - piano, zither, melodica

References

Arista Records albums
Anthony Braxton albums
1982 albums
Albums produced by Michael Cuscuna